The Islamic Affairs and Charitable Activities Department (IACAD) is an agency of the government of Dubai, United Arab Emirates.

It was founded in 1969. The Department was originally known as the Department of Awqaf, and it was responsible for awqaf (in Islamic law, a religious endowment). Subsequently Islamic affairs were added to the department's responsibilities.

References

External links

Government agencies of Dubai
1969 establishments in the Trucial States